Roger Muñoz (born January 20, 1984), is a Nicaraguan professional basketball player.  He currently plays for the Leones de la Alcaldia club of the Liga Nicaragüense de Baloncesto in Nicaragua.

He represented Nicaragua men's national basketball team at the 2016 Centrobasket, where he played most minutes for his team.

References

External links
 Latinbasket.com profile
 REAL GM profile

1984 births
Living people
Nicaraguan men's basketball players
Centers (basketball)
Sportspeople from Managua
Trinity Valley Cardinals men's basketball players